Cedric Reed (born October 9, 1992) is a former American football defensive end. He was signed by the Buffalo Bills as an undrafted free agent in 2015. He played college football at Texas.

College career
Reed made 32 starts for the Longhorns, tallying 37 career tackles for loss, 18 sacks, and six forced fumbles.

Professional career

Buffalo Bills
Reed was signed by the Buffalo Bills as an undrafted free agent following the 2015 NFL Draft. On August 31, 2015, he was released by the Bills. On September 11, 2015, the Bills signed Reed to their practice squad. 
On July 30, 2016, Reed was released by the Bills.

Miami Dolphins
Reed later signed with the Miami Dolphins. On September 3, 2016, he was released by the Dolphins as part of final roster cuts.

Los Angeles Wildcats
In October 2019, Reed was picked by the Los Angeles Wildcats as part of the 2020 XFL Draft's open phase. He had his contract terminated when the league suspended operations on April 10, 2020.

Personal life
Reed’s cousin, Jonathan Marshall, currently plays in the National Football League with the Pittsburgh Steelers.

References

1992 births
Living people
Buffalo Bills players
Los Angeles Wildcats (XFL) players
Miami Dolphins players
People from Cleveland, Texas
Players of American football from Texas
Sportspeople from the Houston metropolitan area
Texas Longhorns football players